Percival Wesley Colee (11 November 1892 – 4 September 1944) was an Australian rules footballer who played with Melbourne in the Victorian Football League (VFL).

Notes

External links 

Percy Colee on Demonwiki

1892 births
Australian rules footballers from Victoria (Australia)
Melbourne Football Club players
1944 deaths